Wagner Domingues Costa (5 November 1968 – 9 September 2018), known professionally as Mr. Catra, was a Brazilian singer and actor. He was known in Brazilian pop culture for his large number of children, having two wives, and his famous laugh at the beginning or ending of his songs.

Biography

Education 
Mr. Catra graduated in law and was a polyglot, speaking English, French, German and Hebrew, besides his native Brazilian Portuguese.

Family 
He had 33 recognized children with 18 women, Catra used to say that "he always adds 2 because he never knows if he has more (children) around that he doesn't know of". He never asked for a paternity test. Two of his children are adopted and are HIV positive. He had been with one of his three wives for 22 years. One of his sons died at 5 years old, leaving the singer traumatized by his loss. In 2011 he converted to Judaism.

Death 
Catra was diagnosed with stomach cancer in January 2017 and died on 9 September 2018.

Discography 
 O Bonde dos Justos (1994)
 O Segredo do Altíssimo (1996)
 O Fiel (1999)
 Bonde do Tesão (2001)
 Proibidão Liberado (2004)
 Humildade é Tudo (2007)
 Poder da Favela (2008)
 Com Todo Respeito ao Samba  (2012)

References

External links
 

1968 births
2018 deaths
Musicians from Rio de Janeiro (city)
Afro-Brazilian musicians
20th-century Brazilian male singers
20th-century Brazilian singers
Funk carioca musicians
Brazilian hip hop musicians
Converts to Judaism
Deaths from stomach cancer
Deaths from cancer in São Paulo (state)
21st-century Brazilian male singers
21st-century Brazilian singers
Black Jewish people
Brazilian Jews